James or Jim Houston may refer to:

Sportspeople
James Houston (rugby league) (born 1982), Scottish rugby league player
Jim Houston (James Edward Houston, 1937–2018), American football linebacker
James Houston (American football) (born 1998), American football player

Other people
James Houston (judge) (1767–1819), Maryland federal judge
James Archibald Houston (1921–2005), Canadian author and artist
James D. Houston (1933–2009), American novelist
James M. Houston (born 1922), Canadian theologian
Jimmy Houston, pro angler and TV host